The Jacksonville Jaguars Radio Network is an American radio network composed of 21 radio stations which carry English-language coverage of the Jacksonville Jaguars, a professional football team in the National Football League (NFL). An additional station also carries Spanish-language coverage of the team.

Since 2014, Jacksonville market stations WJXL, WJXL-FM, and WGNE-FM have served as the network's three flagships. The network also includes 18 affiliates in the U.S. states of Florida, Georgia and South Carolina: seven AM stations, six of which supplement their signals with a low-power FM translator; ten full-power FM stations; and one HD Radio subchannel which supplements its signal with a low-power FM translator. Frank Frangie is the lead announcer along with color commentators Jeff Lageman and Tony Boselli. Spanish-language game coverage is broadcast over WFXJ, which supplements its signal with an FM translator and an HD Radio subchannel simulcast.

In addition to traditional over-the-air AM and FM broadcasts, network programming airs on satellite radio via Sirius XM and is available online via Sirius XM, TuneIn and NFL+.

Station list

English-language stations 

Blue background indicates FM translator.
Gray background indicates station is a simulcast of another station.

Spanish-language stations 

Blue background indicates FM translator.
Gray background indicates station is a simulcast of another station.

References

External links 
Jaguars radio affiliates

National Football League on the radio
Sports radio networks in the United States